The 2016 OEC Kaohsiung was a professional tennis tournament played on hard courts. It was the fifth edition of the tournament which was part of the 2016 ATP Challenger Tour. It took place in Kaohsiung, Taiwan between 17 and 25 September 2016.

Singles main-draw entrants

Seeds

 1 Rankings are as of September 12, 2016.

Other entrants
The following players received wildcards into the singles main draw:
  Jimmy Wang
  Lee Kuan-yi
  Yang Tsung-hua
  Wu Tung-lin

The following player received entry into the singles main draw using a protected ranking:
  Matija Pecotić

The following players received entry from the qualifying draw:
  Yuya Kibi
  Christopher Rungkat
  Takuto Niki
  Yasutaka Uchiyama

Champions

Singles

 Hyeon Chung def.   Lee Duck-hee, 6–4, 6–2.

Doubles

 Sanchai Ratiwatana /  Sonchat Ratiwatana def.  Hsieh Cheng-peng /  Yi Chu-huan, 6–4, 7–6(7–4)

References

External links
Official Website

OEC Kaohsiung
OEC Kaohsiung
2016 in Taiwanese tennis